Metopina is a genus of flies in the family Phoridae.

Species
M. abbreviata Disney & Mikhailovskaya, 1998
M. aequatoriana Borgmeier & Prado, 1975
M. alacinia Disney & Mikhailovskaya, 1998
M. amapaensis Borgmeier, 1967
M. andersoni Disney, 2003
M. angustiterga Disney & Mikhailovskaya, 1998
M. australiana Borgmeier, 1963
M. braueri (Strobl, 1880)
M. ciceri Disney, 1988
M. cindybrownae Disney, 2003
M. climieorum Disney, 1994
M. costalis Borgmeier, 1959
M. crassinervis Schmitz, 1920
M. crinita Borgmeier, 1959
M. divergens Borgmeier & Prado, 1975
M. elongata Disney & Mikhailovskaya, 1998
M. eminentis Disney & Mikhailovskaya, 1998
M. fenyesi Malloch, 1912
M. formicomendicola Schmitz, 1927
M. fragilis Borgmeier, 1969
M. fumipennis Borgmeier, 1967
M. furcans Schmitz, 1928
M. galeata (Haliday, 1833)
†M. goeleti Grimaldi, 1989
M. grandimitralis Yang & Wang, 1995
M. grootaerti Disney, 2003
M. heselhausi Schmitz, 1914
M. howseae Disney, 2003
M. inaequalis Schmitz, 1927
M. nepheloptera Beyer, 1966
M. nevadae Schmitz, 1957
M. obsoleta Beyer, 1960
M. oligoneura (Mik, 1867)
M. palustris Disney & Mikhailovskaya, 1998
M. papuana Disney, 2003
M. perpusilla (Six, 1878)
M. photophila Borgmeier, 1959
M. pileata Schmitz, 1936
M. porteri Silva Figueroa, 1916
M. psociformis (Silvestri, 1947)
M. queenslandensis Disney, 2003
M. recurvata Borgmeier, 1969
M. reflexa Borgmeier, 1969
M. rhenana Beyer & Schmitz, 1957
M. ruthenica Disney & Mikhailovskaya, 1998
M. speciosa Borgmeier, 1969
M. subarcuata Borgmeier, 1963
M. tanjae Disney & Prescher, 2003
M. tarsalis Borgmeier & Prado, 1975
M. trochanteralis Schmitz, 1953
M. tumida Borgmeier, 1969
M. ulrichi Disney, 1979
M. vanharteni Disney, 2006
M. ventralis Schmitz, 1927
M. zikani Borgmeier, 1969

References

Phoridae
Platypezoidea genera